Lonchaea chorea is a species of fly in the family Lonchaeidae. It is found in the Palearctic.  
The larva develops in cow dung.

Description
For terms see Morphology of Diptera.
Long 3–5 mm. 
Male interocular space eye twice as wide as the antenna, more narrow in front. Thorax and abdomen shiny black with blue, green or purple reflections. Wings more or less yellow at the base. Squamae with long marginal cilia. Black halteres. Short subdiscoid abdomen.

Female interocular space slightly less wide than the eye. Lunula with white pruinosity. Antenna dark brown and extended to the epistome.

Biology
March–December, on leaves, bushes, shrubs, etc. Larva under old bark, in cow dung, causing decay in beets, under the bark of pine with Tomicus piniperda under Quercus bark.

Distribution
partial
Throughout Europe, from Ireland Sweden to Spain and Italy. Macedonia. Also Ecuador.

References

External links
Images representing  Lonchaea chorea  at BOLD

Lonchaeidae
Insects described in 1781
Muscomorph flies of Europe